Baker Inlet is an inlet in the North Coast region of British Columbia, Canada, extending east from Grenville Channel opposite Pitt Island, to the south of Kumealon Inlet.

See also
Grenville Channel
Inside Passage
Kumealon Inlet

References

North Coast of British Columbia
Inlets of British Columbia